Nouel is a French surname, it may refer to:

Adolfo Alejandro Nouel (1862–1937), archbishop, educator and politician
Gide Loyrette Nouel, independent French law firm based in Paris
Maimón, Monseñor Nouel, town in the Monseñor Nouel province of the Dominican Republic
Monseñor Nouel Province, province of the Dominican Republic

French-language surnames